Para powerlifting is one of the sports at the quadrennial Commonwealth Games. It has been a Commonwealth Games sport since 2002 (with core sport status through 2022), though it was initially held as part of the weightlifting competitions; in contrast to other parasports, it is categorised separately since the able-bodied equivalent is not a Games sport.

The sport made its debut as a single openweight competition for men in 2002; a women's openweight competition followed in 2010, and each gender has contested 2 weight classes since 2014. Nigeria has been the dominant nation in this sport, winning every single gold medal across five Games (and all medals awarded at Delhi 2010).

Editions

All-time medal table
Updated after 2022 Commonwealth Games

*Note : Medals awarded in Games before 2014 were allocated to weightlifting and are not included.

Games records

References

 
Sports at the Commonwealth Games
Commonwealth Games